Hengdian East railway station is a railway station on the Shiwu Passenger Railway and the Beijing–Guangzhou–Shenzhen–Hong Kong High-Speed Railway. It is in Huangpi District, Wuhan, Hubei Province, China. The station opened in 2009.

Railway stations in Hubei
Stations on the Shijiazhuang–Wuhan High-Speed Railway